Philippe Di Santo (2 April 1950 – 23 October 2012) was a Belgian footballer.

Di Santo played professional association football for K. Sint-Truidense V.V. and Pescara Calcio. After he retired from playing, Di Santo coached the youth side of K.A.S. Eupen.

References

1950 births
2012 deaths
Belgian footballers
Sint-Truidense V.V. players
Delfino Pescara 1936 players

Association footballers not categorized by position